The 1906 Kendall Orange and Black football team represented Henry Kendall College—now known as the University of Tulsa—as an independent during the 1906 college football season. Led by Ben McCurtain in his first and only season as head coach, the team compiled a record of 2–0.

Schedule

References

Kendall
Tulsa Golden Hurricane football seasons
College football undefeated seasons
Kendall Orange and Black football